Che Alias bin Hamid (Jawi: ; is a Malaysian politician. He chairs the Kemaman Port Authority (LPKmn).

Election results

Honours
 :
  Companion of the Order of Loyalty to the Crown of Malaysia (JSM) (2021)

References

Living people
People from Terengganu
Malaysian people of Malay descent
Members of the Dewan Rakyat
21st-century Malaysian politicians
Year of birth missing (living people)